Orissaare is a small borough in Saaremaa Parish, Saare County in western Estonia on the island of Saaremaa.

Orissaare TV Mast (180 m) is located in Orissaare.

An oak growing in the middle of Orissaare stadium won the title of European Tree of the Year in 2015.

Notable people from Orissaare
 Kalle Laanet (born 1965), politician
 Ott Aardam (born 1980), actor
 Kaie Kand (born 1984), heptathlete
 Villu Kõve (born 1971), Chief Justice of the Supreme Court of Estonia

Gallery

References

Populated places in Saare County
Boroughs and small boroughs in Estonia